Fat Man After Dark was a radio talk show that aired on various stations in the Washington, DC metropolitan area from 2006 to 2011. The show went exclusively online in 2010 and moved to Blog Talk Radio in March 2011 before going off the air completely later that year.

History
Fat Man After Dark (FMAD) premiered on an internet radio station based in Silver Spring, Maryland in 2006 before moving to WGMU, the official radio station of George Mason University in 2007. The show aired twice a week on WGMU for several months. After an abundance of technical issues including problems with access to the broadcast and taking phone calls, the show went off the air in the winter of 2007.

On August 6, 2009 the show returned to the airwaves at 950 AM WCTN, a terrestrial radio station that has undergone many formats during its time in business. Fat Man After Dark aired Thursdays from 8 to 10pm on WCTN. A repeat of the show was aired Saturdays at the same time. The show's run on 950 AM would end in October 2009 when the station switched to a Spanish-language format.

After leaving WCTN, the show ran online weekly Friday nights from 7 to 9pm with shows available for download following the live broadcast.

On October 7, 2010 the show was put on hiatus by the host. The FMAD blog continued and the Fat Man became involved with a weekly professional wrestling and MMA podcast entitled Future Endeavors. By popular demand the show returned March 2, 2011 and aired live Wednesday nights from 10pm to midnight eastern with archived programs available for streaming or download.

In the summer of 2011, Fat Man After Dark ceased production in favor of a new entertainment show called Am I On The Air, airing on Red Dragons Radio, the same network as Future Endeavors. A third, sports-centric show, Matza Balls and Strikes, was added to the network in 2012. In 2013, all three shows moved to a recorded podcast format after numerous technical issues with the live feed provided by Blog Talk Radio. The Fat Man now goes by his Twitter handle Nick Gator.

Format and topics
The show followed a stream of consciousness format with a mixture of phone calls and emails along with tangential monologues from the host, known only as the Fat Man. Segments of the show were broken up by music requested by listeners or selected by the Fat Man or his producer.

Topics ran the gamut and no show was exactly the same as the previous ones though a number of correspondents checkrf in at various times to discuss major areas including film, politics, and cooking. Sports was also a recurring theme but the Fat Man was always quick to point out that he doesn't consider his show sports talk radio.

A number of inside jokes evolved over the course of the show's time on the air, poking fun at either FMAD listeners or celebrities. Whenever discussing New York Giants quarterback Eli Manning, the Fat Man asked callers to refer to him as "Fredo", the dim-witted and less talented brother of Michael Corleone in The Godfather, a reference to Eli's more successful brother, Peyton.

Another sports figure who was a subject for FMAD is former Tennessee quarterback Tee Martin. Martin's name is mentioned particularly in reference to a long-time listener of the show who also attended the University of Tennessee. The domain teemartin.com is owned by a Fat Man After Dark associate and directly points to the FMAD website.

Other media
The Fat Man became a regular contributor to various professional wrestling shoot interviews presented by Kayfabe Commentaries under the Youshoot banner. Wrestlers including the Honky Tonk Man, The Iron Sheik, and Joanie Laurer answered his questions. In one interview, host Sean Oliver mistaken referred to him as "Fat Man After Dinner."

Controversy
On the August 27, 2009 show, food blogger the Thrifty DC Cook was making her first appearance on the show and cursed on the air. She had to be bleeped by a producer. The Fat Man said that it was the first person that had ever been bleeped since the show had previously been on internet radio, outside the purview of United States Federal Communications Commission (FCC).

Contributors
Upon its return in March 2011, the Fat Man had a new producer and sidekick in DX Don Mega. Don remained the show's movie reviewer and followed the Fat Man onto the entertainment show Am I On The Air.

Previous contributors to the show have included:
 James Poulos (the Post Modern Conservative), Senior Political Correspondent
 Black Man After Dark, host of the segment "Pie Down" which looks at things that were once great but have fallen on hard times
 Thrifty DC Cook, Senior Food Correspondent

References

American comedy radio programs
American talk radio programs
American sports radio programs